Bulbophyllum crassinervium is a species of orchid in the genus Bulbophyllum. The orchid is usually red, though it has been also known to be purple or yellow.

References
The Bulbophyllum-Checklist
The Internet Orchid Species Photo Encyclopedia

crassinervium